Maa Beti (English: Mother Daughter) is a 1986 Indian Family drama film starring Bollywood actors Shashi Kapoor, Sharmila Tagore, Tanuja, Meenakshi Sheshadri in the lead roles.

Plot
Savitri lives a wealthy lifestyle with her businessman husband and daughter, Meenu. She gets pregnant a second time and gives birth to a son, Khetan, but tragically passes away. Her husband, unable to handle business and two children at the same time, re-marries a woman named Laxmi. Laxmi, unaware of her brother Raghunandan's evil plans, ill-treats her stepchildren, causing them to run away. However, her life changes forever when Raghunandan swindles all their money and kicks Laxmi and her family out of the house.

Cast 
 Shashi Kapoor as Ketan's dad
 Sharmila Tagore as Savitri
 Tanuja as Laxmi
 Meenakshi Sheshadri as Meenu / Asha
 Pran as Ramu
 Kader Khan as Shiv Prasad
 Ashok Saraf as Shankar Prasad
 Jayshree T. as Shanta
 Sachin as Ketan 
 Nilu Phule as Raghunandan
 Manmohan Krishna as Professor
 Shubha Khote as Courtesan 
 C. S. Dubey as Purushottamlal

Soundtrack
Anjaan write the lyrics.

References

External links
 

1987 films
1980s Hindi-language films
Films scored by Anand–Milind
Films directed by Kalpataru